Thomas Hessert III (born May 22, 1986) is an American professional stock car racing driver. He most recently competed part-time in the ARCA Menards Series, driving the No. 55 Toyota Camry for Venturini Motorsports and the No. 22 Ford Fusion for Chad Bryant Racing. He has raced in the series for over a decade and also made two NASCAR Gander RV & Outdoors Truck Series starts in 2010 for Germain Racing. In his eight full-time seasons in ARCA, he has finished in the top-10 in points every year, including in the top-5 in five of those eight years. He finished second in the ARCA point standings in 2016, his most recent full-time season in ARCA.

Racing career

Early career
Hessert became the youngest driver to compete in the Rolex 24 when he drove in the event in 2003 at age 16 alongside his father Tom Jr. Both of them shared the No. 68 for The Racer's Group.

ARCA career

Despite coming off the heels of a second-place points finish, Hessert decided to only run part-time in 2017 to spend more time with his family but left the door open to returning full-time in the future. He ended up running five races that season, sharing the Venturini No. 25 with Spencer Davis, Raphaël Lessard, Natalie Decker, Tanner Thorson and Christopher Bell.

He returned to Venturini for the season-opener at Daytona in 2018, this time in the No. 55 as Decker was driving the No. 25 full-time that year. Hessert's next start and only other of 2018 did not come until the race at IRP, where he drove the No. 22 for Chad Bryant Racing at that race as a replacement for Chase Briscoe, who could not compete after the race was rescheduled a month later than it was supposed to be run due to rain, and the new race date conflicted with his Xfinity schedule. CBR is the successor team to Cunningham Motorsports, who Hessert drove the No. 77 for full-time previously.

After having not competed in any races in the series in 2019, Hessert returned to ARCA in their January 2020 preseason test session at Daytona, where he drove the No. 2 car for Chad Bryant Racing.

Personal life
Hessert is the son of former sports car racing driver Tom Hessert Jr., who won the 1988 IMSA GT Championship, and three times in both the 24 Hours of Daytona and the 12 Hours of Sebring. His family is involved in the auto industry, owning several car dealerships in the Philadelphia metropolitan area, including Cherry Hill Classic Cars, which has sponsored Hessert during various points of his career, particularly during his time driving the Cunningham No. 77 in ARCA.

He was raised in Cherry Hill, New Jersey and attended Cherry Hill High School East. Hessert currently lives in Cherry Hill with his wife and young children, his eldest being named Tom Hessert IV.

Motorsports career results

NASCAR
(key) (Bold – Pole position awarded by qualifying time. Italics – Pole position earned by points standings or practice time. * – Most laps led.)

Camping World Truck Series

K&N Pro Series East

ARCA Menards Series
(key) (Bold – Pole position awarded by qualifying time. Italics – Pole position earned by points standings or practice time. * – Most laps led.)

References

External links
  
 

NASCAR drivers
ARCA Menards Series drivers
Racing drivers from New Jersey
1986 births
Living people
Cherry Hill High School East alumni
People from Cherry Hill, New Jersey
Sportspeople from Camden County, New Jersey
USAC Silver Crown Series drivers